Leptodactylus didymus is a species of frogs in the family Leptodactylidae.

It is found in Bolivia and Peru.

Its natural habitats are subtropical or tropical moist lowland forests, swamps, intermittent freshwater marshes, pastureland, rural gardens, urban areas, and heavily degraded former forest.

References

didymus
Amphibians described in 1996
Taxonomy articles created by Polbot